Found All the Parts is an EP released by Cheap Trick in 1980.  It was released on a 10-inch disc as part of Epic Records' short-lived Nu-Disk series.  The EP also contained a bonus promotional 7" single of "Everything Works If You Let It".  Found All the Parts was re-issued in 12-inch format in 1983.

"Day Tripper" was not actually recorded live. While the band had recorded a live cover of the song, they did not like the way it had turned out. It was rerecorded in the studio with the live crowd from the original track added in. "Can't Hold On" was from the Budokan concert in 1978 and has since been included on the Budokan II and Cheap Trick at Budokan: The Complete Concert albums. "Such a Good Girl" and "Take Me I'm Yours" were recorded with producer Jack Douglas between December 1979 and January 1980, not 1976 and 1977 as the album claims. Several other tracks were recorded during the same sessions, most of which are scarce or still remain unreleased (see outtakes below).

This EP is currently available as bonus tracks to the 2006 remastered re-issue of the All Shook Up album in every region except Japan, where it was re-issued in remastered form on its own in 2003.

In 2016, Cheap Trick released the similarly titled four-song Found New Parts EP on Big Machine Records as a limited edition vinyl disc in 10", 33⅓ RPM format.

Track listing

Outtakes 
 "I Need Love" (Available on the Sex, America, Cheap Trick box set)
 "Loser" (Available on the Legacy Rock Experience sampler)
 "Oh Boy (w/Vocals)" (Available on the Oh Boy (Demo)/If You Want My Love (Demo) promotional single)
 "Fan Club" (Available on a "Trickfest (I)" prize cassette)
 "Ain't Got You" (Available on the "Trickfest (I)" prize cassette)
 "You Talk Too Much" (Available on the "Trickfest (I)" prize cassette, later re-recorded for the album Next Position Please)
 "I Was a Fool" (Unreleased)

Personnel
 Robin Zander – lead vocals, rhythm guitar
 Rick Nielsen – lead guitar, vocals
 Tom Petersson – bass guitar, vocals
 Bun E. Carlos – drums

Additional personnel
 Jack Douglas - Executive producer

References

1980 debut EPs
Cheap Trick EPs
Epic Records EPs